No Exit is a 1930 British romantic comedy film directed by Charles Saunders and starring John Stuart, Muriel Angelus and James Fenton. It is built around a case of mistaken identity. The film was a quota quickie made by the British subsidiary of Warner Brothers at Welwyn Studios.

Cast
 John Stuart as Bill Alden 
 Muriel Angelus as Ann Ansell 
 James Fenton as Mr. Ansell 
 Janet Alexander as Mrs. Ansell 
 John Rowal as Harry Matthews

References

Bibliography
Chibnall, Steve. Quota Quickies: The Birth of the British 'B' Film. British Film Institute, 2007.
Low, Rachael. Filmmaking in 1930s Britain. George Allen & Unwin, 1985.
Wood, Linda. British Films, 1927–1939. British Film Institute, 1986.

External links
 

1930 films
1930 romantic comedy films
British romantic comedy films
Films shot at Welwyn Studios
Films directed by Charles Saunders
Films set in England
British black-and-white films
Quota quickies
Warner Bros. films
1930s English-language films
1930s British films